Sean Patrick Byrne (23 August 1955 – 11 August 2003) was an association football player who played as a defender. Born in Ireland, he represented the New Zealand national team at international level.

Byrne made his full All Whites debut in a 2–1 win over Fiji on 18 October 1984  and ended his international playing career with five A-international caps to his credit, his final cap an appearance in a 5–1 win over Taiwan on 5 October 1985.

References

External links

1955 births
2003 deaths
New Zealand association footballers
Association football defenders
New Zealand international footballers
League of Ireland players
St Patrick's Athletic F.C. players